AISS may refer to:

Ahmad Ibrahim Secondary School, a secondary school in Yishun, Singapore
American International School System, a private coeducational school in Lahore, Pakistan